Wu Chun-ching is a Taiwanese footballer who plays as a midfielder for Tatung F.C.

Club career
On 19 December 2014, Wu transferred to China League One side Hunan Billows.?

International career

International goals
Scores and results list Taiwan's goal tally first.

References 

1988 births
Living people
Taiwanese footballers
Chinese Taipei international footballers
Association football midfielders
Hunan Billows players
Footballers from Tainan
Wu Chun-ching